Downtown Martinsburg Historic District is a national historic district located at Martinsburg, Berkeley County, West Virginia. It encompasses 281 contributing buildings.  It includes government and industrial buildings, several schools, firehouses, and churches, the two main commercial and professional areas along Queen and King Streets, a major hospital, and surrounding residential areas. The buildings reflect a number of popular 19th-century architectural styles including Gothic Revival, Italianate, and Queen Anne.

It was listed on the National Register of Historic Places in 1980.

References

Historic districts in Martinsburg, West Virginia
Queen Anne architecture in West Virginia
Gothic Revival architecture in West Virginia
Italianate architecture in West Virginia
Historic districts on the National Register of Historic Places in West Virginia